Minutes to Midnight World Tour was the fourth concert tour by American rock band Linkin Park. It was launched in support of Linkin Park's third studio album, Minutes to Midnight (2007). Linkin Park Underground the official fan club of the band released a live album as a part of their annual releases named as LP Underground 7.0. It consisted of the live performances of the shows across the 2007-Minutes to Midnight tour.

Background
The tour was announced in April 2007 after the release of the hit single What I've Done. The tour consists of five legs. The first leg consisted of shows in Germany, United Kingdom and United States.  The leg under the name Promo Tour began on April 28, 2007 in Berlin, Germany and ended on May 19, 2007 in Irvine, California, where they played at KROQ Weenie Roast y Fiesta. The first leg consisted of ten shows which took place for twenty-two days.

After three days band moved towards Europe and started the "Minutes To Midnight European Tour" which consisted of sixteen shows and a tenure of twenty-four days. Bands like Thirty Seconds to Mars, Blindside and Jane Air, served as special guests for the leg. The band played in various European countries like Denmark, Sweden, Germany, Netherlands, France and Russia. After the European tour the band continued their Projekt Revolution festivals chain in America, as Projekt Revolution 2007. Linkin Park decided to make the tour ostensibly "green" by donating $1 of every ticket to American Forests through their charity Music for Relief and using biodiesel on a majority of their buses, eliminating an estimated 350 tons of carbon emissions. There were also informative booths that showed concert goers how to lower their greenhouse gas emissions. Gerard Way, lead singer of My Chemical Romance was married backstage to Lyn-Z, bassist of Mindless Self Indulgence, after the final show on the Revolution tour.

Later on the band continued the tour after Project Revolution as Australian and New Zealand Tour, Minutes To Midnight Asian Tour, Minutes To Midnight North American Tour and again European tour.

Set list
These set lists are representative of the average set list throughout shows.
{{hidden
| headercss = background: #ccccff; font-size: 100%; width: 65%;
| contentcss = text-align: left; font-size: 100%; width: 75%;
| header = Set A
| content =

"Gunshot Intro #1" / "One Step Closer"
"Lying from You"
"Somewhere I Belong
"No More Sorrow
"Papercut"
"Points of Authority"
"From the Inside"
"Leave Out All the Rest"
"Numb"
"The Little Things Give You Away"
"Breaking the Habit"
"Shadow of the Day"
"Crawling"
"In the End"
"Bleed It Out"
Encore
"Pushing Me Away" (Piano Version)
"What I've Done"
"Faint"
}}

Personnel
 Chester Bennington - vocals, rhythm guitar on "Shadow of the Day"
 Mike Shinoda - rap/lead/backing vocals; rhythm guitar, keyboards, piano, samplers
 Brad Delson - lead guitar
 Dave Farrell - bass, backing vocals on "The Little Things Give You Away"; rhythm guitar on "Leave Out All the Rest"
 Joe Hahn - turntables, samplers
 Rob Bourdon - drums, percussion

Tour dates

Notes

References

External links

Linkin Park concert tours
2007 concert tours
2008 concert tours